The Co-leaders of the Scottish Green Party are the leaders of the Scottish Green Party. The incumbents are Patrick Harvie and Lorna Slater who were elected in August 2019, succeeding Patrick Harvie and Maggie Chapman.

History 
The position of co-leaders of the party were created on 1 August 2019, due to changes in the party's constitution. The changes replaced the old co-conveners system with a new co-leader system. An election for this was held, which Lorna Slater and Patrick Harvie won. The voting system used was the Single Transferable Vote. The constitution changes also stated that at least one of the leaders has to be a woman.

List of Co-leaders

Present

Former Co-convenor

References

Scottish Green Party co-leadership elections